Anjozorobe is a district of Analamanga in Madagascar.

Communes
The district is further divided into 18 communes:

 Alakamisy
 Ambatomanoina
 Amboasary
 Ambohibary Vohilena
 Ambohimanarina Marovazaha
 Ambohimirary
 Ambongamarina
 Analaroa
 Andranomisa
 Androvakely
 Anjozorobe
 Antanetibe Anativolo
 Belanitra
 Beronono
 Betatao
 Mangamila
 Marotsipoy
 Tsarasaotra, Anjozorobe

Nature reserves
The Anjozorobe-Angavo Reserve is situated approximately 11 km East of the town of Anjozorobe.

References 

Districts of Analamanga